Landomycinone is the aglycone of the landomycins.

References

Tetrols
Angucyclines